William Alexander Weir (October 15, 1858 – October 22, 1929) was a Quebec lawyer, politician, and judge. He was the MLA for Argenteuil in the Legislative Assembly of Quebec from 1897–1910, held several ministries, and helped rewrite several provincial Codes.

Biography

Early life
William Alexander Weir was born in Montreal on October 15, 1858, the son of William Park Weir and Helen Craig Smith, who had emigrated from Scotland to Canada in 1852. William Park Weir became Surveyor of Customs in the Port of Montreal. His brother, Robert Stanley Weir, would become famous as a judge and author of the English verses for O Canada.

Weir was educated at the High School of Montreal and McGill University, earning a B.C.L. degree in 1881, and was called to the Bar of Quebec on July 12, 1881.

He married Adelaide Sayers Stewart, daughter of William C. Stewart of Hamilton, Ontario in October 1885.

Early career
During the time he practised law, Weir also wrote for The Montreal Star from 1880–1881 and the Argenteuil County News from 1895–1897.

Weir published several special editions of Quebec Civil Codes and he served as Secretary of the Royal Commission to revise the Code of Civil Procedure in 1897.

Political career
Weir's first attempt at election to the Legislative Assembly of Quebec in 1890 failed. In 1897, he ran again and succeeded in winning the riding of Argenteuil, representing the Liberal Party of Quebec.

He was appointed Minister without Portfolio in 1903 under Premier Simon-Napoléon Parent. On February 3, 1905, Weir, Lomer Gouin, and Adélard Turgeon joined forces and resigned from Cabinet in a push to force Parent out of the leadership. Gouin then became Premier on March 21, 1905 and Weir served as Minister without Portfolio (1905), Speaker (1905–1906), Minister of Public Works and Labour (1906–1907), and Provincial Treasurer (1907–1910).

Judge
Upon appointment as a judge for the Quebec Superior Court on January 11, 1910, Weir resigned his seat. He presided over the Workman libel trial in May 1911.

He finished his career becoming a Montreal District Court judge in 1923.

Death
William Alexander Weir died on October 22, 1929 in London, England.

Published works
 Municipal Code of the Province of Quebec (1889)
 Civil Code of the Province of Quebec (1890)
 Codes of the Province of Quebec (1890)
 An Insolvency Manual (1890)
 The Educational Act of the Province of Quebec (1899)
 Code of Civil Procedure (1900)

References
 Joseph Graham The Lost History of Weir. Retrieved June 18, 2005.
 
 Ed. Henry James Morgan (1912). Canadian Men & Women of the Time 1912. Toronto: William Briggs. William Alexander Weir excerpt. Retrieved June 18, 2005.
 Université de Sherbrooke Bilan du Siècle - William Alexander Weir (1858-1929) Homme politique, avocat. (in French) Retrieved June 18, 2005.
 Assemblée nationale du Québec. Argenteuil electoral results since 1867. (in French) Retrieved June 18, 2005.

See also
 Robert Stanley Weir
 Simon-Napoléon Parent
 Argenteuil (provincial electoral district)

1858 births
1929 deaths
High School of Montreal alumni
Lawyers from Montreal
Quebec Liberal Party MNAs
Judges in Quebec
Presidents of the National Assembly of Quebec
Politicians from Montreal
McGill University Faculty of Law alumni